Magic Radio is a British digital radio station owned and operated by Bauer. The station is available on 105.4 FM in London and across the UK on Digital Radio, on the Magic Radio app, television and online.

It had previously been a part of a network of Magic stations broadcast on FM in London and on MW across northern England and began broadcasting across the UK via the Digital One multiplex in January 2015.  On 5 January 2015, Magic Radio launched nationally on DAB and all other Magic stations were dissolved to form the Bauer City 2 network.

According to RAJAR, the station broadcasts to a weekly audience of 3.6 million with a listening share of 2.1% as of September 2022.

History

In 1998, Melody FM was purchased by media group Emap from Hanson plc for a reported £25 million and rebranded Magic that December.

On changing the station's name, Emap introduced automation for the first time - weekday afternoons were split with a 'non-stop music hour', first sponsored by the now defunct energy company Calortex, and later by the Emap-owned Red magazine.  Magic was criticised for automating a further eleven hours of its daily output (7pm-6am) given the reach and size of the station.

In an attempt to cut costs, Magic began networking its mid-morning show, hosted by Richard Skinner, and automated overnight output with the eight other Magic stations in the North of England in January 2002.  Audience figures fell on all nine stations in the twelve months that followed, some arguing a lack of local content had driven listeners to tune away.  Networking was ended in January 2003, although the eight 'northern' Magic stations continued to share a mid-morning show, hosted by Mark Thorburn, and were subsequently networked again, with the exception of local breakfast shows, following a repositioning of the northern Magic group in mid-2006. These stations were later rebranded into the Bauer City 2 network in 2015.

The end of networking heralded a programming shift; Magic adopting its 'more music, less talk' ethos. Former Capital FM head and radio consultant Richard Park was brought in to increase the station's audience share.  In September 2003, Magic saw its first major revamp: live programming replaced automated output in the evening, and Independent Radio News-employed staff manned the station's daytime news output, removing shared presenting/newsreading responsibilities, a legacy from Melody FM.  IRN retained the contract to supply Magic's news bulletins until 2015, when the service was brought in-house.

Later years saw a reliance on weekend celebrity-hosted content and large cash prizes to entice listeners - the award of £110,600 to Nicola Diss, the winner of the popular Magic Mystery Voices contest on 12 January 2006 was the largest cash prize given away on UK radio since 1999, a sum surpassed just a few months later by the prize collected by listener Dawn Muggleton in the Smooth Secret Song competition on London rival 102.2 Smooth FM, scooping £118,454 on 19 April 2006. However, Magic regained the honour on 30 March 2007 with listener Maria Crosskey winning £168,600 in a six-month-long Mystery Voices contest, although she was later disqualified (see 'Mystery Voices' below).

In 2008, Emap sold its radio stations, including Magic, to Bauer Media Group.

Magic, along with urban-music station Kiss, rock music station Absolute Radio and a number of other radio brands, broadcasts from Bauer Radio's headquarters in Golden Square. It had previously broadcast from studios on Winsley Street (Mappin House) until September 2014.

Sister stations

Digital

Magic Chilled
Launched March 2016 and playing "laid back hits", predominantly pop and R'n'B from the 90s to today; the format originated as an evening programme strand on Heat Radio (as 'heat Chilled') but moved under the Magic brand to be launched as a full-time station. Magic Chilled was Bauer's first DAB+ station. It was originally broadcast on the national Sound Digital multiplex, but moved to local tier DAB, in capacity previously used by Absolute Radio 90s, in early 2019 as part of the reorganisation of space for the launch of Scala Radio. In London, Magic Chilled continues to be broadcast in DAB+ at the same bitrate as before.

Mellow Magic
Mellow Magic is a digital-only service of timeless relaxing classics, launched in March 2016 along with Magic Chilled. It continues to broadcast as part of the Sound Digital national multiplex jointly owned by Bauer. The Mellow Magic station was built on the successful Magic night-time programming strand of the same name. Fran Godfrey has hosted the breakfast show on Mellow Magic, its only dedicated live programme, since the station's official launch; the station previously simulcast the Mellow Magic programmes of the main Magic station, but this ceased when Magic temporarily flipped to a Christmas music format.

Magic Soul
This was originally a temporary pop-up service, branded as Magic Soul Summer, which launched in the summer of 2016 largely taking over the capacity previously occupied by the temporary Magic ABBA station; the soul service ultimately remained active as a permanent part of the network, truncating its name to Magic Soul from Autumn 2016 onwards.

Magic at the Musicals
Launched on DAB+ in London on 21 November 2019; the station has since been rolled out to several other areas, chiefly on selected Bauer-owned multiplexes, in standard DAB. It plays show-tunes and soundtracks.

Pop-ups

Magic ABBA
Following the migration of other Bauer services (including Kisstory and Heat Radio) to SDL, some of the vacated space at local level was used during the spring of 2016 for a short-term pop-up, playing ABBA songs (and versions thereof) and related content. It ran as a commercial partnership with Mamma Mia!: the Musical.

Magic Workout
An online-only sibling, Magic Workout has been made available as one of a suite of streaming-only Bauer services. The temporary service formed part of Magic's partnership with breast cancer charity Walk The Walk's Moonwalk event.
A similar service, Cool FM Workout, was launched by Bauer in partnership with the Belfast City Marathon in 2021.

Magic Christmas / Magic 100% Christmas
In late 2017, a slot on the Digital One multiplex which had been occupied since the summer by Kiss Fresh was temporarily used by a Christmas music station under the Magic Christmas banner; it was one of two festive stations available on D1 that year, with Heart Extra making its annual switch to Heart Extra Christmas around the same time. (During 2018, this capacity was used by Absolute Radio 90s, and since February 2019 the space has been occupied by Kisstory). In December 2018 and 2019, the main Magic station flipped to an all-Christmas playlist, and so a discrete Christmas station was not provided.

Magic 100% Christmas was launched online in August 2020, several months earlier than previous Christmas music stations in order to, according to Bauer, help lift the mood of the nation after the COVID-19 pandemic. Unlike the earlier Magic Christmas, this service did not broadcast on DAB.

Bond 24/7
Bond 24/7 was a pop-up station which ran from 29 September to 6 October 2021. It was launched to mark the release of the 25th film in the James Bond series No Time to Die and would play music from the James Bond films.

Television

Magic TV
There is also a complementary Magic-branded music television channel available on the Sky, Freesat and Virgin Media digital TV platforms in the UK, operating as part of The Box Plus Network. The channel plays classic and contemporary melodic pop hits.

Notable presenters 

Emma B
Ronan Keating
Lemar
Lynn Parsons
Tom Price
Harriet Scott
Sonali Shah

References

External links 

Magic 105.4 Radio Player
Magic Voices Radio "Winner" Awaits Judge's Verdict

Bauer Radio
Radio stations established in 1990
Radio stations in London
Adult contemporary radio stations in the United Kingdom
Bauer City network
1990 establishments in England